State Street–Henry Street Historic District is a national historic district located at Binghamton in Broome County, New York.  The district includes 20 contributing buildings.  The district lies north of the central business district in an area long associated with small manufacturing and commercial establishments.  The majority of the buildings were built in the late 19th or early 20th century and all but two are built of brick with an average height of four stories.  Located within the district is the U.S. Post Office and Courthouse.

It was listed on the National Register of Historic Places in 1986.

References

Buildings and structures in Binghamton, New York
Historic districts on the National Register of Historic Places in New York (state)
Historic districts in Broome County, New York
National Register of Historic Places in Broome County, New York